Meganne Louise Wyatt (born 1987) is an Anglo-Australian-Italian member of the 2022 European Space Agency Astronaut Group, materials scientist at the National Research Council (CNR) in Bologna, Italy, and atmospheric physicist at Concordia Station in Antarctica.

Research 
At the Italian National Research Agency (CNR) in Bologna, she worked on the production and microscopical characterisation of graphene-based nanocomposites, in particular 3D graphene structures such as graphene foams, as part of the EU's Graphene Flagship. This included zero-gravity research in 2018, studying the application of loop heat pipes for the heat management of satellites. She held the role of atmospheric physicist and meteorologist at the Franco-Italian Antarctic research base at Concordia Station during the 2019 "DC15" Winter-over campaign and the 2020-21 Summer season.

Biography 

Born in Kent, England to New Zealand parents, at five she moved with her family to Wollongong, Australia. She attended The Illawarra Grammar School and was part of the school's 2002 international championship team of Future Problem Solving Program International. Studying at the University of New South Wales, in 2009 Christian received a Bachelor of Engineering and the university medal in industrial chemistry. Continuing at UNSW, she received the 2011 Heinz Harant award and her doctorate in 2014 for research into hydrogen storage with borohydrides. After which she moved in Bologna and works at the Institute of Microelectronics and Microsystems (IMM) at the National Research Council of Italy. The ambassador of Australia to Italy featured Christian as part of International Day of Women and Girls in Science 2021. She was married on Australia Day 2014 at St James' Church, Sydney to Liam Wyatt. She received Italian citizenship in 2022.

References

External links 

 Astronaut profile at European Space Agency (ESA)
 Staff profile at Consiglio Nazionale delle Ricerche (CNR) 

English emigrants to Australia
University of New South Wales alumni
Women Antarctic scientists
1987 births
Living people
Astronaut candidates
British astronauts
European Space Agency personnel
21st-century New Zealand women scientists
21st-century Australian women scientists
21st-century Italian women scientists
21st-century British women scientists